Paul Richard Gallagher,  (born 23 January 1954) is an English prelate of the Catholic Church who has been Secretary for Relations with States within the Holy See's Secretariat of State since November 2014. He has worked in the diplomatic service of the Holy See since 1984 and held the rank of archbishop and apostolic nuncio since 2004, serving as nuncio in Burundi, Guatemala, and Australia.

Biography

Early life
He was born in Liverpool, England, and was educated at St Francis Xavier’s College in Woolton. Ordained by Archbishop Derek Worlock on 31 July 1977 for the Archdiocese of Liverpool, he served in Fazakerley, before taking courses at the Pontifical Ecclesiastical Academy. He later earned a doctorate in canon law from the Pontifical Gregorian University, becoming a member of the Holy See's diplomatic service on 1 May 1984.

Episcopate
He held posts in Tanzania, Uruguay, the Philippines, and  the Vatican Secretariat of State. He was appointed Counselor, First Class, on 1 May 1997, when working at the Nunciature in Burundi. He worked in its Second Section, from 1995 to 2000 at the same time as the present Cardinal Secretary of State, Pietro Parolin.

On 18 August 2000, Pope John Paul II named him Special Envoy as Permanent Observer to the Council of Europe in Strasbourg.

John Paul appointed him Apostolic Nuncio to Burundi on 22 January 2004. His residence in that country was bombed in 2008.

He was appointed nuncio to Guatemala on 19 February 2009.

Ruth Gledhill, the religious affairs correspondent of The Times, mentioned him as a possible candidate for the position of Archbishop of Westminster in succession to Cardinal Cormac Murphy-O'Connor. However, the successor, announced on 3 April 2009, was Archbishop Vincent Nichols.

On 11 December 2012, he was appointed Papal Nuncio to Australia, a post he held until being made Secretary for Relations with States on 8 November 2014 by Pope Francis.

In 2015 a comprehensive agreement was signed by the Holy See and Palestine which may serve the twofold goal of stimulating peace in the Middle East and providing a model for similar treaties. The text of the treaty was agreed upon 13 May, and the document was signed 26 June in the Apostolic Palace by Gallagher and by Riad al-Malki, minister of foreign affairs of Palestine. Gallagher voiced hope “that the present agreement may in some way be a stimulus to bringing a definitive end to the long-standing Israeli-Palestinian conflict, which continues to cause suffering for both parties. I also hope that the much desired two-state solution may become a reality as soon as possible.”

In an interview, Gallagher said that the Joint Comprehensive Plan of Action agreed in 2015 is seen positively because it believes that controversies and difficulties must always be resolved through dialogue and negotiation. The deal reached is the result of years of negotiations over a question that had caused a great deal of concern. The fact that the solution found satisfies all sides is a very positive thing. Clearly, this agreement will require the continued efforts and commitment of everyone if it is to bear fruit. It is significant that there is a mutual trust between the Parties.

In a February 2016 interview he said, "Let's not be kidding ourselves about what the stakes are here: If we are going to bring peace, if we are going to reconcile nations, if we are going to secure countries and communities, particularly minorities, particularly people who are persecuted, we are going to have to make an unprecedented effort," Gallagher speaking specifically of the crisis in Syria and Iraq, where so-called Islamic State militants have captured large swaths of territory and driven out tens of thousands of Christians and members of other minority groups, Gallagher said he is hopeful for a resolution of the conflict".

In March 2021, Archbishop Gallagher said that Pope Francis’ visit to Iraq was “a geopolitical problem, because Christians have always been there, they have always had a role amidst the other communities, the larger, more powerful communities,”.

Speaking on the 2022 Russian invasion of Ukraine, Archbishop Gallagher was asked if his comments describing Russia as the aggressor were spoken in the name of the pope. Gallagher replied how "I was speaking in the name of the Holy See, and the Holy Father hasn’t corrected me so far on what I’ve said on his behalf".

Archbishop Gallagher was the representative of Pope Francis and the Vatican at the state funeral of Queen Elizabeth II in London, England on September 19, 2022.

Gallagher speaks native English, near-native Italian and fluent French and Spanish.

Honours
  Grand Cross of the Order of Prince Henry (23 April 2016)

See also
 List of foreign ministers in 2017
 List of current foreign ministers

References

|-

|-

|-

|-

1954 births
20th-century English Roman Catholic priests
21st-century English Roman Catholic priests
Apostolic Nuncios to Australia
Apostolic Nuncios to Guatemala
Permanent Observers of the Holy See to the Council of Europe
Living people
Pontifical Ecclesiastical Academy alumni
Roman Catholic titular archbishops
Secretaries for Relations with States of the Holy See
Clergy from Liverpool
Diplomats of the Holy See